Struga is a town in Macedonia.

Struga may also refer to:

Struga, Lower Silesian Voivodeship (south-west Poland)
Struga, Łódź Voivodeship (central Poland)
Struga, Lubusz Voivodeship (west Poland)
Struga, Bytów County in Pomeranian Voivodeship (north Poland)
Struga, Chojnice County in Pomeranian Voivodeship (north Poland)
Struga, Kościerzyna County in Pomeranian Voivodeship (north Poland)
Struga, West Pomeranian Voivodeship (north-west Poland)
Struga, Szczecin, a part of the Szczecin City
Struga Municipality, a municipality in western Republic of North Macedonia, the seat of which is Struga
Struga (river), a river of Saxony, Germany
Struga, Croatia, a village near Sveti Đurđ, Varaždin County, Croatia
Struga Castle, a 16th century castle in Gumberk, Slovenia